Blackwall is a surname. Notable people with the surname include:

Anthony Blackwall (1672–1730), English clergyman
John Blackwall (1790–1881), English naturalist